Gunpo-dong is neighbourhood of Gunpo, Gyeonggi Province, South Korea. It is officially divided into Gunpo-1-dong and Gunpo-2-dong.

External links
 Gunpo-1-dong 
 Gunpo-2-dong 

Neighbourhoods in Gunpo